A carrot is a vegetable.

Carrot may also refer to:

Art and entertainment
"Carrots" (song), a single by Panda Bear
 Carrots, a 2019 EP by Bish included within Carrots and Sticks
Carrots (Pillow Pal), a Pillow Pal bunny made by Ty, Inc.
Captain Carrot, a DC Comics superhero
Carrot Ironfoundersson, a fictional character from the Discworld series
Carrot Top, born Scott Thompson (1965), American actor and comedian
“Carrots”, an episode of The Good Doctor

Computing
Carrot2, a search results clustering engine and open source project
Carrot Rewards, a personal health mobile app for residents in three Canadian provinces

Other uses
Camberwell carrot, a slang term for cannabis
Wild carrot, a flowering plant also known as Queen Anne's lace

See also

Carrot and stick
Carrot River (disambiguation), Saskatchewan, Canada
Carrott, surname of multiple people
Carat (disambiguation)
Caret (disambiguation)
Karat (disambiguation)